Arif Nazar oglu Heydarov (Azeri: Arif Nəzər oğlu Heydərov, June 28, 1926, Agdash—June 29, 1978, Baku) was a Soviet Azerbaijani state figure and a General-Lieutenant of the Soviet Azerbaijani Ministry of Internal Affairs. He headed this ministry from March 19, 1970, until his death. Previously he used to work in security agencies. Heydarov was shot by Shusha prison officer Zia Muradov in his office, along with Deputy Minister of Internal Affairs Salahaddin Kazimov. Muradov then shot himself. 

During the Soviet-German War Heydarov fought in the Battle of Berlin. He was awarded several Soviet orders and medals, including the Order of the Red Banner.

See also
Minister of Internal Affairs of Azerbaijan

References

Sources
Azerbaijani Soviet Encyclopedia
MIA.gov.az

Azerbaijani communists
Soviet Azerbaijani people
1926 births
1978 deaths
Soviet lieutenant generals